Corybas abditus, commonly known as the swamp helmet orchid or small helmet orchid , is a species of terrestrial orchid endemic to Western Australia. It is a rare orchid with a single bluish green, heart-shaped leaf and a small flower with an enlarged dorsal sepal and tube-shaped labellum.

Description 
The leaf is bluish green with three whitish veins on the upper surface and purplish on the lower side. Flowering occurs from September to November.

Taxonomy 
Corybas abditus was first formally described in 1991 by David Jones from a specimen collected near Bakers Junction north of Albany and the description was published in Australian Orchid Research. The specific epithet (abditus) is a Latin word meaning "hidden" or "concealed", referring to the cryptic nature of this orchid and it dense habitat.

In 2002, David Jones and Mark Clements proposed splitting Corybas into smaller genera and placing this species into Anzybas but the change has not been widely accepted.

Distribution and habitat
The swamp helmet orchid grows in dense vegetation on small mounds in dense winter-wet swamps. It occurs in disjunct populations between Nannup and Esperance.

Conservation
Corybas abditus is classified as "Priority Three" by the Government of Western Australia Department of Parks and Wildlife meaning that it is poorly known and known from only a few locations but is not under imminent threat.

References 

abditus
Endemic orchids of Australia
Orchids of Western Australia
Plants described in 1991